The Pocatello Carnegie Library is a historic building in Pocatello, Idaho. It was built as a Carnegie library in 1907, and designed in the Palladian architectural style. According to Arthur Hart, the director of the Idaho State Historical Museum, "Pilasters are topped with stone triglyphs in the narrow frieze. On the entry facade the words "Public Library" in appropriate Roman letters identify the buildings original function." The building has been listed on the National Register of Historic Places since July 2, 1973.

References

Carnegie libraries in Idaho
Library buildings completed in 1907
National Register of Historic Places in Bannock County, Idaho
Palladian Revival architecture in the United States
1907 establishments in Idaho